The 2010 Gulf Ice Hockey Championship was the first Gulf Ice Hockey Championship. It took place between 25 May and 30 May 2010 in Kuwait City, Kuwait. The United Arab Emirates won the tournament winning all three of their games and finishing first in the standings. Kuwait finished second and Saudi Arabia finished in third place.

Overview
The 2010 Gulf Ice Hockey Championship began on 25 May 2010 in Kuwait City, Kuwait with the games being played at the National Ice Skating Rink. The Oman and Saudi Arabia their made their debut in international competition. The event was organised by the Kuwait Ice Hockey Association and supervised by the International Ice Hockey Federation who also provided referees. The United Arab Emirates won the tournament, winning all three games and finishing first in the standings. Kuwait finished second after losing only to the United Arab Emirates and Saudi Arabia finished in third place.

Standings

Fixtures

References

Gulf
Gulf Ice Hockey Championship
Gulf Ice Hockey Championship
International ice hockey competitions hosted by Kuwait